NPWS may stand for:

 National Parks & Wildlife Service South Australia
 National Parks and Wildlife Service (Ireland)
 NSW National Parks & Wildlife Service